A landrace is a type of domestic animal or plant adapted to the natural and cultural environment in which it originated, with minimal selective breeding.  Some have "landrace" in the names:

 Danish landrace duck
 Danish landrace goose

The term is also used informally in reference to cannabis plants to designate specific varieties, e.g. Colombian Gold, etc.; these are more properly cultivars, not landraces.

Capitalized, the term is also used in the name of several "Landrace breeds", selectively-bred, standardized breeds, derived wholly or in part from actual landraces:

Pigs

American Landrace pig
Belgian Landrace pig
British Landrace pig
Bulgarian Landrace pig
Canadian Landrace pig
Danish Landrace pig
Dutch Landrace pig
Finnish Landrace pig
French Landrace pig
German Landrace pig
Italian Landrace pig
Norwegian Landrace pig
Polish Landrace pig
South African Landrace pig
Swedish Landrace pig
Swiss Landrace pig

Geese
Twente Landrace goose

Goats
British Landrace goat, better known as the British Primitive goat or Old British goat; it subsumes earlier classifications:
 English Landrace goat
 Irish Landrace goat
 Scottish Landrace goat
 Welsh Landrace goat
Danish Landrace goat
Dutch Landrace goat
Finnish Landrace goat
Swedish Landrace goat

Sheep
 Danish Landrace sheep
 Finnish Landrace sheep, or Finnsheep
 Old Norwegian Short Tail Landrace, or Spælsau

See also